David Kvachadze (born 25 December 1951) is a Georgian boxer. He competed in the men's light heavyweight event at the 1980 Summer Olympics. Won the European 1977 championship and the Soviet championships in 1976, 1977, and 1980. In 1977, he was named the Georgian Athlete of the Year.

References

1951 births
Living people
Male boxers from Georgia (country)
Olympic boxers of the Soviet Union
Boxers at the 1980 Summer Olympics
Sportspeople from Tbilisi
Light-heavyweight boxers
20th-century people from Georgia (country)